Iuliana Pantelimon (born 23 July 1975) is a Romanian butterfly swimmer. She competed in two events at the 1992 Summer Olympics.

References

External links
 

1975 births
Living people
Romanian female butterfly swimmers
Olympic swimmers of Romania
Swimmers at the 1992 Summer Olympics
Place of birth missing (living people)